The Warsaw Comic Con is an annual pop culture fan convention held in Warsaw, Poland. First established in 2017, it is the biggest festival of this kind in Poland, if you do not count Pyrkon and is organized in Ptak Warsaw Expo - the largest exhibition and conference centre in Central Europe.

Events
The Warsaw Comic Con is dedicated to comic books, computer games, TV series, science-fiction, fantasy, anime, manga, horror and cosplay fans and enthusiasts. It takes place twice a year and is divided into the Spring and the Autumn Editions. The event features popular actors and celebrities from the world of pop culture movies, TV series, games and comics, and gives visitors  the opportunity to meet actors, writers, comic book professionals, e-sport players and YouTube personalities, attend panel discussions and take part in interviews as well as offers genre-related gadgets, computer games, comic books, cosplay items, videos and various collectibles. Other attractions of the festival include cosplay competitions, music concerts, Warsaw Games Show, steel figures exhibition of comic book characters, Hollywood film props exhibition, board games area, LEGO Area, and the COBI Area for the enthusiasts of militaria.

Locations and dates

See also
Science fiction and fantasy in Poland
International Festival of Comics and Games in Łódź
Pyrkon

References

Multigenre conventions
Comics conventions
Recurring events established in 2017
2017 establishments in Poland